Canterbury Flames were a New Zealand netball team based in Christchurch, Canterbury. Between 1998 and 2007 they played in the Coca-Cola Cup/National Bank Cup league. In 2008, when the National Bank Cup was replaced by the ANZ Championship, Canterbury Flames were rebranded as Canterbury Tactix.

Stats

Grand finals

Notable former players

Internationals

 Charlotte Kight

 Cynna Kydd

 Vilimaina Davu

 Julianna Naoupu

Captains

Coaches

Head coaches

Main sponsors

References 

Mainland Tactix
National Bank Cup teams
Defunct netball teams in New Zealand
Sports clubs established in 1998
1998 establishments in New Zealand